The 1890 Illinois Fighting Illini football team was an American football team that represented the University of Illinois during the 1890 college football season. The team was first fielded at the University of Illinois. Coached, captained and quarterbacked by Scott Williams, the team was not affiliated with a conference and compiled a 1–2 record.

Schedule

Roster

References

Illinois
Illinois Fighting Illini football seasons
Illinois Fighting Illini football